These are the official results of the Men's 10,000 metres event at the 1994 European Championships in Helsinki, Finland. The final was held at Helsinki Olympic Stadium on 7 August 1994.

Medalists

Final

Participation
According to an unofficial count, 24 athletes from 14 countries participated in the event.

 (1)
 (1)
 (1)
 (1)
 (2)
 (2)
 (1)
 (2)
 (3)
 (1)
 (3)
 (1)
 (3)
 (2)

See also
 1992 Men's Olympic 10,000 metres (Barcelona)
 1993 Men's World Championships 10,000 metres (Stuttgart)
 1995 Men's World Championships 10,000 metres (Gothenburg)
 1996 Men's Olympic 10,000 metres (Atlanta)

References

 Results

10000
10,000 metres at the European Athletics Championships
Marathons in Finland